Morduch is a surname. Notable people with the surname include:

Jonathan Morduch (born 1963), American economist
Ida Morduch-Ekman, Finnish soprano singer